Bernabel "Bernie" Castro (born July 14, 1979) is a former Major League Baseball second baseman. He played two major league seasons, one each with the Washington Nationals and Baltimore Orioles.

Career
After two seasons, the Yankees traded him to the San Diego Padres for outfielder Kevin Reese.

After becoming a free agent in the  offseason, Castro signed a minor league deal with the Baltimore Orioles. He played in 24 games for the major league team, hitting .288 with a .360 on-base percentage.

He again became a free agent after the  season, and signed with the Washington Nationals. He played in 42 games for the Nationals during the 2006 season, accumulating 110 at-bats.

Castro was granted free agency once more after the  season, and signed a minor league contract with the Yankees. He again became a free agent after the  season.

Throughout his career he has showed impressive speed and solid contact abilities along with a strong arm and good instincts at second base.

During the winter he played for his hometown Aguilas Cibaeñas in the Dominican Winter League.

After his playing career ended, Castro became a hitting coach for the Dominican Summer League Pirates.

References

External links

1979 births
Living people
Águilas Cibaeñas players
Baltimore Orioles players
Columbus Clippers players
Dominican Republic expatriate baseball players in Canada
Dominican Republic expatriate baseball players in the United States
Greensboro Bats players
Gulf Coast Yankees players

Major League Baseball players from the Dominican Republic
Major League Baseball second basemen
Minor league baseball coaches
Mobile BayBears players
New Orleans Zephyrs players
Ottawa Lynx players
Portland Beavers players
Scranton/Wilkes-Barre Yankees players
Sportspeople from Santo Domingo
Staten Island Yankees players
Washington Nationals players
Central American and Caribbean Games gold medalists for the Dominican Republic
Central American and Caribbean Games medalists in baseball
Competitors at the 2010 Central American and Caribbean Games